Asymmetric hydrogenation is a chemical reaction that adds two atoms of hydrogen to a target (substrate) molecule with three-dimensional spatial selectivity.  Critically, this selectivity does not come from the target molecule itself, but from other reagents or catalysts present in the reaction. This allows spatial information (what chemists refer to as chirality) to transfer from one molecule to the target, forming the product as a single enantiomer. The chiral information is most commonly contained in a catalyst and, in this case, the information in a single molecule of catalyst may be transferred to many substrate molecules, amplifying the amount of chiral information present. Similar processes occur in nature, where a chiral molecule like an enzyme can catalyse the introduction of a chiral centre to give a product as a single enantiomer, such as amino acids, that a cell needs to function.  By imitating this process, chemists can generate many novel synthetic molecules that interact with biological systems in specific ways, leading to new pharmaceutical agents and agrochemicals. The importance of asymmetric hydrogenation in both academia and industry contributed to two of its pioneers — William Standish Knowles and Ryōji Noyori — being awarded one half of the 2001 Nobel Prize in Chemistry.

History 
In 1956 a heterogeneous catalyst made of palladium deposited on silk was shown to effect asymmetric hydrogenation.  Later, in 1968, the groups of William Knowles and Leopold Horner independently published the examples of asymmetric hydrogenation using a homogeneous catalysts. While exhibiting only modest enantiomeric excesses, these early reactions demonstrated feasibility. By 1972, enantiomeric excess of 90% was achieved, and the first industrial synthesis of the Parkinson's drug L-DOPA commenced using this technology.

The field of asymmetric hydrogenation continued to experience a number of notable advances.  Henri Kagan developed DIOP, an easily prepared C2-symmetric diphosphine that gave high ee's in certain reactions. Ryōji Noyori introduced the ruthenium-based catalysts for the asymmetric hydrogenated polar substrates, such as ketones and aldehydes. The introduction of P,N ligands then further expanded the scope of the C2-symmetric ligands, although they are not fundamentally superior to chiral ligands lacking rotational symmetry. Today, asymmetric hydrogenation is a routine methodology in laboratory and industrial scale organic chemistry.

The importance of asymmetric hydrogenation was recognized by the 2001 Nobel Prize in Chemistry awarded to William Standish Knowles and Ryōji Noyori.

Mechanism

Inner sphere mechanisms
Two major mechanisms have been proposed for catalytic hydrogenation with rhodium complexes: the unsaturated mechanism and the dihydride mechanism.  While distinguishing between the two mechanisms is difficult, the difference between the two for asymmetric hydrogenation is relatively unimportant since both converge to a common intermediate before any stereochemical information is transferred to the product molecule.

The preference for producing one enantiomer instead of another in these reactions is often explained in terms of steric interactions between the ligand and the prochiral substrate.  Consideration of these interactions has led to the development of quadrant diagrams where "blocked" areas are denoted with a shaded box, while "open" areas are left unfilled.  In the modeled reaction, large groups on an incoming olefin will tend to orient to fill the open areas of the diagram, while smaller groups will be directed to the blocked areas and hydrogen delivery will then occur to the back face of the olefin, fixing the stereochemistry.  Note that only part of the chiral phosphine ligand is shown for the sake of clarity.

Metals

Platinum-group metals 
Rhodium, the first metal to be used in a homogeneous asymmetric hydrogenation, continues to be widely used.  Targets for asymmetric hydrogenation with rhodium generally require a coordinating group close to the alkene.  While this requirement is a limitation, many classes of substrates possess such functionalization, e.g. unsaturated amides.

The Noyori asymmetric hydrogenation is based on ruthenium.  Subsequent work has expanded upon Noyori's original catalyst template, leading to the inclusion of traditionally difficult substrates like t-butyl ketones and 1-tetralones as viable substrates for hydrogenation with ruthenium catalysts.  Transfer hydrogenation based on the Ru and TsDPEN has also enjoyed commercial success.

Iridium catalysts are useful for a number of "non-traditional" substrates for which good catalysts had not been found with Ru and Rh.  Unfunctionalized olefins are the archetypal case, but other examples including ketones exist.  A common difficulty with iridium-based catalyst is their tendency to trimerize in solution. The use of the non-coordinating anion BAr− has proven to be the most widely applicable solution to the aggregation problem. Other strategies to enhance catalyst stability include the addition of an additional coordinating arm to the chiral ligand, increasing the steric bulk of the ligand, using a dendrimeric ligand, increasing the rigidity of the ligand, immobilizing the ligand, and using heterobimetallic systems (with iridium as one of the metals).

Base metals 
Iron is a popular research target for many catalytic processes, owing largely to its low cost and low toxicity relative to other transition metals.  Asymmetric hydrogenation methods using iron have been realized, although in terms of rates and selectivity, they are inferior to catalysts based on precious metals.  In some cases, structurally ill-defined nanoparticles have proven to be the active species in situ and the modest selectivity observed may result from their uncontrolled geometries.

Ligand classes

Phosphine ligands 
Chiral phosphine ligands, especially C2-symmetric ligands, are the source of chirality in most asymmetric hydrogenation catalysts. Of these the BINAP ligand is well-known, as a result of its Nobel Prize-winning application in the Noyori asymmetric hydrogenation.

Chiral phosphine ligands can be generally classified as mono- or bidentate.  They can be further classified according to the location of the stereogenic centre – phosphorus vs the organic substituents.  Ligands with a C2 symmetry element have been particularly popular, in part because the presence of such an element reduces the possible binding conformations of a substrate to a metal-ligand complex dramatically (often resulting in exceptional enantioselectivity).

Monodentate phosphines 
Monophosphine-type ligands were among the first to appear in asymmetric hydrogenation, e.g., the ligand CAMP.  Continued research into these types of ligands has explored both P-alkyl and P-heteroatom bonded ligands, with P-heteroatom ligands like the phosphites and phosphoramidites generally achieving more impressive results. Structural classes of ligands that have been successful include those based on the binapthyl structure of MonoPHOS  or the spiro ring system of SiPHOS.  Notably, these monodentate ligands can be used in combination with each other to achieve a synergistic improvement in enantioselectivity; something that is not possible with the diphosphine ligands.

Chiral diphosphine ligands 
The diphosphine ligands have received considerably more attention than the monophosphines and, perhaps as a consequence, have a much longer list of achievement.  This class includes the first ligand to achieve high selectivity (DIOP), the first ligand to be used in industrial asymmetric synthesis (DIPAMP) and what is likely the best known chiral ligand (BINAP).  Chiral diphosphine ligands are now ubiquitous in asymmetric hydrogenation.

P,N and P,O ligands 

The use of P,N ligands in asymmetric hydrogenation can be traced to the C2 symmetric bisoxazoline ligand.  However, these symmetric ligands were soon superseded by monooxazoline ligands whose lack of C2 symmetry has in no way limits their efficacy in asymmetric catalysis.  Such ligands generally consist of an achiral nitrogen-containing heterocycle that is functionalized with a pendant phosphorus-containing arm, although both the exact nature of the heterocycle and the chemical environment phosphorus center has varied widely.  No single structure has emerged as consistently effective with a broad range of substrates, although certain privileged structures (like the phosphine-oxazoline or PHOX architecture) have been established.  Moreover, within a narrowly defined substrate class the performance of metallic complexes with chiral P,N ligands can closely approach perfect conversion and selectivity in systems otherwise very difficult to target. Certain complexes derived from chelating P-O ligands have shown promising results in the hydrogenation of α,β-unsaturated ketones and esters.

NHC ligands 

Simple N-heterocyclic carbene (NHC)-based ligands have proven impractical for asymmetrical hydrogenation.

Some C,N ligands combine an NHC with a chiral oxazoline to give a chelating ligand. NHC-based ligands of the first type have been generated as large libraries from the reaction of smaller libraries of individual NHCs and oxazolines.  NHC-based catalysts featuring a bulky seven-membered metallocycle on iridium have been applied to the catalytic hydrogenation of unfunctionalized olefins and vinyl ether alcohols with conversions and ee's in the high 80s or 90s. The same system has been applied to the synthesis of a number of aldol, vicinal dimethyl and deoxypolyketide motifs, and to the deoxypolyketides themselves.

C2-symmetric NHCs have shown themselves to be highly useful ligands for the asymmetric hydrogenation.

Acyclic substrates 
Acyclic unsaturated substrates (olefins, ketones, enamines imines) represents the most common prochiral substrates. Substrates that are particularly amenable to asymmetric hydrogenation often feature a polar functional group adjacent to the site to be hydrogenated.  In the absence of this functional group, catalysis often results in low ee's.  For unfunctionalized olefins, iridium with P,N-based ligands) have proven successful catalysts. Catalyst utility within this category is unusually narrow; consequently, many different categories of solved and unsolved catalytic problems have developed. 1,1-disubstituted, 1,2-diaryl trisubstituted, 1,1,2-trialkyl and tetrasubstituted olefins represent classes that have been investigated separately, and even within these classes variations may exist that make different solutions optimal.

Conversely to the case of olefins, asymmetric hydrogenation of enamines has favoured diphosphine-type ligands; excellent results have been achieved with both iridium- and rhodium-based systems. However, even the best systems often suffer from low ee's and a lack of generality. Certain pyrrolidine-derived enamines of aromatic ketones are amenable to asymmetrically hydrogenation with cationic rhodium(I) phosphonite systems, and I2 and acetic acid system with ee values usually above 90% and potentially as high as 99.9%. A similar system using iridium(I) and a very closely related phosphoramidite ligand is effective for the asymmetric hydrogenation of pyrrolidine-type enamines where the double bond was inside the ring: in other words, of dihydropyrroles. In both cases, the enantioselectivity dropped substantially when the ring size was increased from five to six.

Imines and ketones 

Ketones and imines are related functional groups, and effective technologies for the asymmetric hydrogenation of each are also closely related. Of these, Noyori's ruthenium-chiral diphosphine-diamine system is perhaps one of the best known. It can be employed in conjunction with a wide range of phosphines and amines (where the amine may be, but need not be, chiral) and can be easily adjusted for an optimal match with the target substrate, generally achieving enantiomeric excesses (ee's) above 90%.

For carbonyl and imine substrates, end-on, η1 coordination can compete with η2 mode. For η1-bound substrates, the hydrogen-accepting carbon is removed from the catalyst and resists hydrogenation.

Iridium/P,N ligand-based systems are also commonly used for the asymmetric hydrogenation of ketones and imines.  For example, a consistent system for benzylic aryl imines uses the P,N ligand SIPHOX in conjunction with iridium(I) in a cationic complex to achieve asymmetric hydrogenation with ee >90%. One of the most efficient and effective catalysts ever developed for the asymmetric hydrogenation of ketones, with a turnover number (TON) up to 4,550,000 and ee up to 99.9%, uses another iridium(I) system with a closely related tridentate ligand.

Despite their similarities, the two functional groups are not identical; there are many areas where they diverge significantly.  One of these is in the asymmetric hydrogenation of N-unfunctionalized imines to give primary amines. Such species can be difficult to selectively reduce because they tend to exist in complex equilibria of imine and enamine tautomers, as well as (E) and (Z) isomers.  One approach to this problem has been to use ketimines as their hydrochloride salt and rely on the steric properties of the adjacent alkyl or aryl groups to allow the catalyst to differentiate between the two enantiotopic faces of the ketimine.

Aromatic substrates 
The asymmetric hydrogenation of aromatic (especially heteroaromatic), substrates is a very active field of ongoing research. Catalysts in this field must contend with a number of complicating factors, including the tendency of highly stable aromatic compounds to resist hydrogenation, the potential coordinating (and therefore catalyst-poisoning) abilities of both substrate and product, and the great diversity in substitution patterns that may be present on any one aromatic ring. Of these substrates the most consistent success has been seen with nitrogen-containing heterocycles, where the aromatic ring is often activated either by protonation or by further functionalization of the nitrogen (generally with an electron-withdrawing protecting group). Such strategies are less applicable to oxygen- and sulfur-containing heterocycles, since they are both less basic and less nucleophilic; this additional difficulty may help to explain why few effective methods exist for their asymmetric hydrogenation.

Quinolines, isoquinolines and quinoxalines 
Two systems exist for the asymmetric hydrogenation of 2-substituted quinolines with isolated yields generally greater than 80% and ee values generally greater than 90%. The first is an iridium(I)/chiral phosphine/I2 system, first reported by Zhou et al.. While the first chiral phosphine used in this system was MeOBiPhep, newer iterations have focused on improving the performance of this ligand. To this end, systems use phosphines (or related ligands) with improved air stability, recyclability, ease of preparation, lower catalyst loading and the potential role of achiral phosphine additives. As of October 2012 no mechanism appears to have been proposed, although both the necessity of I2 or a halogen surrogate and the possible role of the heteroaromatic N in assisting reactivity have been documented.

The second is an organocatalytic transfer hydrogenation system based on Hantzsch esters and a chiral Brønsted acid. In this case, the authors envision a mechanism where the isoquinoline is alternately protonated in an activating step, then reduced by conjugate addition of hydride from the Hantzsch ester.

Much of the asymmetric hydrogenation chemistry of quinoxalines is closely related to that of the structurally similar quinolines. Effective (and efficient) results can be obtained with an Ir(I)/phophinite/I2 system and a Hantzsh ester-based organocatalytic system, both of which are similar to the systems discussed earlier with regards to quinolines.

Pyridines 
Pyridines are highly variable substrates for asymmetric reduction (even compared to other heteroaromatics), in that five carbon centers are available for differential substitution on the initial ring.  As of October 2012 no method seems to exist that can control all five, although at least one reasonably general method exists.

The most-general method of asymmetric pyridine hydrogenation is actually a heterogeneous method, where asymmetry is generated from a chiral oxazolidinone bound to the C2 position of the pyridine. Hydrogenating such functionalized pyridines over a number of different heterogeneous metal catalysts gave the corresponding piperidine with the substituents at C3, C4, and C5 positions in an all-cis geometry, in high yield and excellent enantioselectivity. The oxazolidinone auxiliary is also conveniently cleaved under the hydrogenation conditions.

Methods designed specifically for 2-substituted pyridine hydrogenation can involve asymmetric systems developed for related substrates like 2-substituted quinolines and quinoxalines. For example, an iridium(I)\chiral phosphine\I2 system is effective in the asymmetric hydrogenation of activated (alkylated) 2-pyridiniums or certain cyclohexanone-fused pyridines. Similarly, chiral Brønsted acid catalysis with a Hantzsh ester as a hydride source is effective for some 2-alkyl pyridines with additional activating substitution.

Indoles 
The asymmetric hydrogenation of indoles initially focused on N-protected indoles, where the protecting group could serve both to activate the heterocycle to hydrogenation and as a secondary coordination site for the metal. Later work allowed unprotected indoles to be targeted through Brønsted acid activation of the indole.

In the initial report on asymmetric indole hydrogenation, N-acetyl 2-substituted indoles could be protected with high yields and ee of 87-95%.  3-substituted indoles were less successful, with hydrolysis of the protecting group outcompeting the hydrogenation of the indole. Switching to an N-tosyl protecting group inhibited the hydrolysis reaction and allowed both 2- and 3-substituted indoles to be hydrogenated in high yield and ee. The problem with both methods, however, is that N-acetyl and N-tosyl groups require harsh cleavage conditions that might be incompatible with complex substrates. Using an easily cleaved N-Boc group would relieve this problem, and highly effective methods for the asymmetric hydrogenation of such indoles (both 2- and 3-substituted) were soon developed.

Despite these advances in the asymmetric hydrogenation of protected indoles, considerable operational simplicity can be gained by removing the protecting group altogether. This has been achieved with catalytic systems utilizing Brønsted acids to activate the indole. The initial system used a Pd(TFA)2/H8-BINAP system to achieve the enantioselective cis-hydrogenation of 2,3- and 2-substituted indoles with high yield and excellent ee. A similar process, where sequential Friedel-Crafts alkylation and asymmetric hydrogenation occur in one pot, allow asymmetric 2,3-substituted indolines to be selectively prepared from 2-substituted indoles in similarly high yields and ee.

A promising organocatalytic method for the asymmetric hydrogenation of 2,3-substituted indoles utilizing a chiral Lewis base also exists, although the observed ee's are not quite equivalent to those of the metal-based hydrogenations.

Pyrroles 

Achieving complete conversion of pyrroles to pyrrolidines by asymmetric hydrogenation has so far proven difficult, with partial-hydrogenation products often being observed. Complete enantioselective reduction is possible, with the outcome depending on both the starting substrate and the method.

The asymmetric hydrogenation of 2,3,5-substituted pyrroles was achieved by the recognition that such substrates bear the same substitution pattern as 2-substituted indoles, and an asymmetric hydrogenation system that is effective for one of these substrates might be effective for both. Such an analysis led to the development of a ruthenium(I)/phosphine/amine base system for 2,3,5-substituted N-Boc pyrroles that can give either dihydro or tetrahydropyrroles (pyrrolidines), depending on the nature of the pyrrole substituents. An all-phenyl substitution pattern leads to dihydropyrroles in very high yield (>96%) and essentially perfect enantioselectivity. Access to the fully hydrogenated, all-cis dihydropyrrole may then be accessible through diastereoselective heterogeneous hydrogenation. Alkyl substitution may lead to either the dihydro or tetrahydropyrrole, although the yields (>70%) and enantioselectivities (often >90%) generally remain high. The regioselectivity in both cases appears to be governed by sterics, with the less-substituted double being preferentially hydrogenated.

Unprotected 2,5-pyrroles may also be hydrogenated asymmetrically by a Brønsted acid/Pd(II)/chiral phosphine-catalyzed method, to give the corresponding 2,5-disubstituted 1-pyrrolines in roughly 70-80% yield and 80-90% ee.

Oxygen-containing heterocycles 

The asymmetric hydrogenation of furans and benzofurans has so far proven challenging.  Some Ru-NHC complex catalyze asymmetric hydrogenations of benzofurans and furans. with high levels of enantioinduction.

Sulfur-containing heterocycles 

As is the case with oxygen-containing heterocycles, the asymmetric hydrogenation of compounds where sulfur is part of the initial unsaturated pi-bonding system so far appears to be limited to thiophenes and benzothiophenes. The key approach to the asymmetric hydrogenation of these heterocycles involves a ruthenium(II) catalyst and chiral, C2 symmetric N-heterocyclic carbene (NHC). This system appears to possess superb selectivity (ee > 90%) and perfect diastereoselectivity (all cis) if the substrate has a fused (or directly bound) phenyl ring but yields only racemic product in all other tested cases.

Heterogeneous catalysis 
No heterogeneous catalyst has been commercialized for asymmetric hydrogenation.

The first asymmetric hydrogenation focused on palladium deposited on a silk support. Cinchona alkaloids have been used as chiral modifiers for enantioselectivity hydrogenation.

An alternative technique and one that allows more control over the structural and electronic properties of active catalytic sites is the immobilization of catalysts that have been developed for homogeneous catalysis on a heterogeneous support.  Covalent bonding of the catalyst to a polymer or other solid support is perhaps most common, although immobilization of the catalyst may also be achieved by adsorption onto a surface, ion exchange, or even physical encapsulation.  One drawback of this approach is the potential for the proximity of the support to change the behaviour of the catalyst, lowering the enantioselectivity of the reaction.  To avoid this, the catalyst is often bound to the support by a long linker though cases are known where the proximity of the support can actually enhance the performance of the catalyst.

The final approach involves the construction of MOFs that incorporate chiral reaction sites from a number of different components, potentially including chiral and achiral organic ligands, structural metal ions, catalytically active metal ions, and/or preassembled catalytically active organometallic cores.  One of these involved ruthenium-based catalysts.  As little as 0.005 mol% of such catalysts proved sufficient to achieve the asymmetric hydrogenation of aryl ketones, although the usual conditions featured 0.1 mol % of catalyst and resulted in an enantiomeric excess of 90.6–99.2%.

Industrial applications 

Knowles' research into asymmetric hydrogenation and its application to the production scale synthesis of L-Dopa gave asymmetric hydrogenation a strong start in the industrial world.  A 2001 review indicated that asymmetric hydrogenation accounted for 50% of production scale, 90% of pilot scale, and 74% of bench scale catalytic, enantioselective processes in industry, with the caveat that asymmetric catalytic methods in general were not yet widely used.

The success of asymmetric hydrogenation in industry  can be seen in a number of specific cases where the replacement of kinetic resolution based methods has resulted in substantial improvements in the process's efficiency.  For example, Roche's Catalysis Group was able to achieve the synthesis of (S,S)-Ro 67-8867 in 53% overall yield, a dramatic increase above the 3.5% that was achieved in the resolution based synthesis.  Roche's synthesis of mibefradil was likewise improved by replacing resolution with asymmetric hydrogenation, reducing the step count by three and increasing the yield of a key intermediate to 80% from the original 70%.

References 

Organic reactions
Chemical processes
Green chemistry
Hydrogenation
Hydrogenation